is an amusement park consisting of an aquarium, shopping mall, hotel, marina and amusement rides. It is located in Hakkeijima, Kanazawa-ku, Yokohama, Kanagawa, Japan. It opened for business on May 8, 1993.

It is a pay-as-you-go theme park, having no gates or admission charges. Visitors have the option of buying a day pass or paying for each attraction separately. With 4,770,000 visitors in 2007, it ranks sixth among Asian amusement parks in terms of attendance.

Yokohama Hakkeijima Inc.
In March 1988, the business was started by nine companies centered on Seibu Group and Prince Hotel. Established Yokohama Hakkeijima Inc. Yokohama City will create an artificial island, Hakkeijima, and rent a part of it to Yokohama Hakkeijima Co. Ltd., which will start operations on May 8, 1993.

Yokohama Hakkeijima is a Seibu Group company, and besides The following facilities operate, manage.

Aqua Resorts

Aqua Resorts is a Public Aquarium located in Yokohama Hakkeijima Sea Paradise. It consists of 4 facilities.

Aqua Museum
"Understanding all the creatures of the sea-Five Experience Lab"

It is a large aquarium with a pyramid-like appearance. The floors are up to the 5th floor, with exhibits on the 1st, 3rd, and 4th floors, and LABO12 "Fishes living in the rich forest, the source of the sea" and the Aqua Theater on the 5th floor. The second floor is off-limits to the general public.

Whale Shark has been open to the public since October 5, 2010. It was the first whale shark having and exhibition facility in eastern Japan. Since he died, he has not exhibited since 2019.

Total floor area 
total tank vol 

 LABO1 "The Sea of Beginnings"
 LABO2 "Sea Jewel Shellium"
 LABO3 "Animal evolved in the sea"
 LABO4 "Animal living in the sea of ice"
 LABO5 "Schools Herd living in vast expanse of sea and sparkling fish "
 LABO6 "The sea and creatures receiving the blessings of the sun"
 LABO7 "Unknown Submarine Canyon Deep Sea Rium"
 LABO8 "Enchanted fish lurking in the sea at night"
 LABO9 "Kurageri Umu"
 LABO10 "Fishes that color coral reefs"
 LABO11 "Forestium"
 LABO12 "Fishes living in the rich forest, the source of the sea"

Aqua stadium

 "Ecology show pool" (outdoor water tank, water volume )
 "Research pool 1" (outdoor water tank, water volume )
 "Research pool 2" (outdoor water tank, water volume )
 "Breeding pool" (outdoor water tank, water volume )
 "Treatment pool" (outdoor water tank, water volume )
 Sea Video Museum / Aqua Theater (720-inch Digital Hi-Vision Theater 130 seats)

Dolphin fantasy

"The world of dreams and healing delivered by dolphins" An aquarium centered on dolphin and Ocean Sunfish exhibits that opened on July 16, 2004. It consists of a tunnel-shaped water tank and a cylindrical water tank. total tank vol 

"Arch aquarium" (water volume )
"Cylindrical aquarium" (water volume )

Fureai Lagoon
"Contact with sea creatures"
It was opened on July 27, 2007. The edge of the aquarium is designed to be low so that people can observe the sea animals on display up close.

Therefore, when a dolphin or whale makes an unexpected jump, it may be sprayed.

Total water volume

Umi Farm

Aquarium with the concept of "sea education" opened on March 8, 2013.  A facility with the theme of "Umiiku" where you can learn about the sea by observing fish and seaweed.

Total area about  2
There are two areas, "Food Education Zone" and "Ocean Lab".
"Food Education Zone" is an area where you can learn about the sea through fishing and eating.
 Fishing Square
 Karatto Kitchen
 Seafood & Grill YAKIYA
 Ocean Lab
 Sea Deck
 Submarine research

In film
Yokohama Hakkeijima Sea Paradise is seen destroyed by Godzilla in the Kaiju film, Godzilla Against Mechagodzilla.

Controversies
About 90 animals died while rare deep-sea creatures were being transferred from an outside laboratory to Yokohama Hakkeijima Sea Paradise. The cause of the death seems to be that the water temperature rose due to a mechanical failure, but it received a lot of criticism from animal rights groups. Also in 2019, the protected whale shark died in two months, causing controversy.

Attractions

The concept is "amusement park in the sea that you can enjoy all day long". It is installed here and there on the island, and many of them have motifs of the sea.

Height-restricted attractions
120 cm or more

 Surf Coaster Leviathan
 Marine Cart Fantasia

110 cm or more
 Aqua Ride II ~ Treasure Hunting Adventure ~

95 cm or more

 Flight Eagle
 Butterflyder

Attractions with no height restrictions
There are age and other restrictions. It depends on each attraction.
 Blue Sky Climbing ROCKN ROCK
 Giant Three-dimensional Maze Dekkai
 Sea Boat, a boat-type attraction that allows you to drive in the natural sea next to the "Umi Farm"

 Sea Paradise Tower
 Merry-go-round
 Bubble Shooting
 Red Baron
 Sea Train
 Pleasure Boat Paradise Cruise

Attractions that cost extra
 Play
 Treasure Stone Park

Arcade
 Carnival House

Attractions that are already closed

 Blue Fall
 Surf Coaster
 Water Shoot
 Splashute
 Octopus
 Drunken Barrel
 Peter Pan
 Kids Adventure
 Heaven and Hell
 Golden Treasure Hunt, Pirate Legend, Cursed Skeleton Island
 Sea Para Walk Rally "Sea Para Detectives"
 Kids Pirates
 Waku Waku Kids Park
 Mini Express
 Seabo
 Golden treasure hunt, LAST PANIC
 Ice Country
 Hospital Enthusiast, hunt for treasure on Glitter Island
 Triple 3 Mission
 Mirror Maze
 Sea Para Kids Town

Adjacent facilities

Restaurant & Fastfood
 Seafood＆Grill YAKIYA
 Hawaiian Cafe & Restaurant Merengue
 La Tarafuku
 Booze Cafe
 Shiosai Cuisine Yasuke
 CLASSIC
 Manjare
 Breeze
 Seaside Oasis
 Dolphin
 Cable Car Coffee
 Marion Crepe
 Kobara Cafe
 Toge Dairy Industry 63 ℃

Shop & amusement
Jinbei SHOP
Aqua Museum Shop
Big Wave
Frendia
Delphis
Shell Garden
Mihama Beach Girl
Souvenir Shop Kofuku
M Cabin
Fresh Loose
Sea Paradise Dice Food Museum
Puku Puku Island
Banana Moon
Ocean Club
YY SHOP
MIRAI Building
LAHAINA CREWS
Aqua Blue
Fantasy Shop

HOTEL
Hotel Sea Paradise Inn

See also
Facilities with the same management:
Maxell Aqua Park Shinagawa
Sendai Umino-Mori Aquarium 
Itabashi Botanical Garden
Joetsu Aquarium Umigatari
Hamurashi Zoo
X PARK
access Kanazawa Seaside Line

References

External links
 Yokohama Hakkeijima SEA PARADISE (English)
 ja.Official Site 横浜・八景島シーパラダイス
 
 
 
 

Artificial islands of Japan
Amusement parks in Japan
Aquaria in Japan
1993 establishments in Japan
Buildings and structures in Yokohama
Tourist attractions in Yokohama
Amusement parks opened in 1993
Seibu Group